The 2012 Florida Gators baseball team represented the University of Florida in the sport of baseball during the 2012 college baseball season.  The Gators competed in Division I of the National Collegiate Athletic Association (NCAA) and the Eastern Division of the Southeastern Conference (SEC).  They played their home games at Alfred A. McKethan Stadium, on the university's Gainesville, Florida campus.  The team was coached by Kevin O'Sullivan, who was in his fifth season at Florida.  The Gators sought to build upon their appearance in the 2011 College World Series Finals, where they were eliminated by South Carolina in two games.

After being eliminated in the semifinals of the SEC Tournament, the Gators were selected as the No. 1 national seed in the NCAA Tournament.  After winning the Gainesville Regional and Super Regional, they advanced to the College World Series for the third consecutive year.  There they were eliminated after just two games, losing to South Carolina and Kent State.

The Gators had nine players selected in the 2012 Major League Baseball Draft including junior catcher Mike Zunino, recipient of the 2012 Dick Howser Trophy.

Roster

Schedule

! style="background:#FF4A00;color:white;"| Regular Season
|- valign="top" 

|- bgcolor="#ddffdd"
| February 17 || No. 16  || No. 1 || McKethan Stadium || 7–3 || Rodriguez (1–0) || Cardona (0–1) || None || 5,356 || 1–0 || –
|- bgcolor="#ddffdd"
| February 18 ||  || No. 1 || McKethan Stadium || 5–2 || Whitson (1–0) || Wiest (0–1) || Maddox (1) || 4,951 || 2–0 || –
|- bgcolor="#ffdddd"
| February 19 ||  || No. 1 || McKethan Stadium || 5–8 || Gauna (1–0) || Crawford (0–1) || Lorenzen (1) || 4,082 || 2–1 || –
|- bgcolor="#ddffdd"
| February 21 || Bethune–Cookman || No. 1 || McKethan Stadium || 8–6 || Maddox (1–0) || Hernandez (0–1) || None || 2,616 || 3–1 || –
|- bgcolor="#ddffdd"
| February 22 || UCF || No. 1 || McKethan Stadium || 8–0 || Crawford (1–1) || Collins (0–1) || None || 2,867 || 4–1 || –
|- bgcolor="#ddffdd"
| February 24 ||  || No. 1 || McKethan Stadium || 4–1 || Randall (1–0) || Shain (0–1) || Maddox (2) || 3,139 || 5–1 || –
|- bgcolor="#ddffdd"
| February 25 || William & Mary || No. 1 || McKethan Stadium || 5–1 || Johnson (1–0) || Wainman (1–1) || None || 4,093 || 6–1 || –
|- bgcolor="#ddffdd"
| February 26 || William & Mary || No. 1 || McKethan Stadium || 5–36 || Rodriguez (2–0) || Inghram (0–2) || None || 2,918 || 7–1 || –
|-

|- bgcolor="#ddffdd"
| March 2 || at No. 8 Rivalry || No. 2 || Alex Rodriguez ParkCoral Gables, FL || 7–5 || Randall (2–0) || Erickson (2–1) || Maddox (3) || 4,233 || 8–1 || –
|- bgcolor="#ddffdd"
| March 3 || at No. 8 Miami (FL)Rivalry || No. 2 || Alex Rodriguez Park || 13–5 || Larson (1–0) || Whaley (1–1) || None || 4,999 || 9–1 || –
|- bgcolor="#ddffdd"
| March 4 || at No. 8 Miami (FL)Rivalry || No. 2 || Alex Rodriguez Park || 8–5 || Magliozzi (1–0) || Encinosa (0–1) || Gibson (1) || 2,124 || 10–1 || –
|- bgcolor="#ddffdd"
| March 6 ||  || No. 1 || McKethan Stadium || 16–1 || Poyner (1–0) || Meiers (1–2) || None || 2,803 || 11–1 || –
|- bgcolor="#ddffdd"
| March 7 ||  || No. 1 || McKethan Stadium || 15–2 || Larson (2–0) || Duncan (1–3) || None || 2,673 || 12–1 || –
|- bgcolor="#ddffdd"
| March 9 ||  || No. 1 || McKethan Stadium || 4–2 || Rodriguez (3–0) || Anderson (1–1) || Maddox (4) || 3,001 || 13–1 || –
|- bgcolor="#ddffdd"
| March 10 || Florida Gulf Coast || No. 1 || McKethan Stadium || 8–3 || Johnson (2–0) || Bixler (2–2) || None || 3,413 || 14–1 || –
|- bgcolor="#ddffdd"
| March 11 || Florida Gulf Coast || No. 1 || McKethan Stadium || 3–2 || Gibson (1–0) || Forjet (0–2) || Maddox (5) || 3,266 || 15–1 || –
|- bgcolor="#ddffdd"
| March 13 || No. 6 Florida StateRivalry || No. 1 || McKethan Stadium || 9–2 || Larson (3–0) || Sitz (1–1) || Maddox (6) || 6,005 || 16–1 || –
|- bgcolor="#F0E8E8"
| March 14 || Ontario Blue Jays (exh.) || No. 1 || McKethan Stadium || colspan=7 | Cancelled (rain); no make-up.
|- bgcolor="#ddffdd"
| March 16 ||  || No. 1 || McKethan Stadium || 10–2 || Randall (3–0) || Ziomek (2–2) || None || 4,141 || 17–1 || 1–0
|- bgcolor="#ddffdd"
| March 17 || Vanderbilt || No. 1 || McKethan Stadium || 5–1 || Johnson (3–0) || VerHagen (2–2) || None || 4,364 || 18–1 || 2–0
|- bgcolor="#ddffdd"
| March 18 || Vanderbilt || No. 1 || McKethan Stadium || 8–2 || Crawford (2–1) || Beede (0–3) || None || 4,088 || 19–1 || 3–0
|- bgcolor="#ddffdd"
| March 20 ||  || No. 1 || McKethan Stadium || 5–3 || Magliozzi (2–0) || Rutledge (0–2) || Maddox (7) || 2,769 || 20–1 || –
|- bgcolor="#ffdddd"
| March 22 || at No. 8 South Carolina || No. 1 || Carolina StadiumColumbia, SC || 3–9 || Price (3–1) || Rodriguez (3–1) || None || 8,242|| 20–2 || 3–1
|- bgcolor="#ddffdd"
| March 23 || at No. 8 South Carolina || No. 1 || Carolina Stadium || 8–2 || Johnson (4–0) || Koumas (1–2) || None || 8,242 || 21–2 || 4–1
|- bgcolor="#ddffdd"
| March 24 || at No. 8 South Carolina || No. 1 || Carolina Stadium || 5–4 || Maddox (2–0) || Price (3–2) || None || 8,242 || 22–2 || 5–1
|- bgcolor="#ddffdd"
| March 27 || vs. No. 4 Florida StateRivalry || No. 1 || Baseball GroundsJacksonville, FL || 4–1 || Magliozzi (3–0) || Busch (0–1) || Maddox (8) || 10,751 || 23–2 || –
|- bgcolor="#ffdddd"
| March 30 || at No. 20  || No. 1 || Swayze FieldOxford, MS || 0–3 || Wahl (5–0) || Randall (3–1) || Huber (6) || 9,311 || 23–3 || 5–2
|- bgcolor="#ddffdd"
| March 31 || at No. 20 Ole Miss || No. 1 || Swayze Field || 9–4 || Magliozzi (4–0) || Chavez (3–1) || None || 10,064 || 24–3 || 6–2
|-

|- bgcolor="#ffdddd"
| April 1 || at No. 20  || No. 1 || Swayze Field || 6–7 || Huber (1–1) || Maddox (2–1) || None || 8,616 || 24–4 || 6–3
|- bgcolor="#ffdddd"
| April 3 || at  || No. 1 || Harmon StadiumJacksonville, FL || 5–10 || Jagodzinski (1–0) || Poyner (1–1) || None || 2,144 || 24–5 || –
|- bgcolor="#ffdddd"
| April 5 || No. 12 LSU || No. 1 || McKethan Stadium || 6–7 || McCune (2–3) || Johnson (4–1) || Goody (3) || 4,487 || 24–6 || 6–4
|- bgcolor="#ddffdd"
| April 6 || No. 12 LSU || No. 1 || McKethan Stadium || 7–0 || Crawford (3–1) || Gausman (5–1) || None || 5,793 || 25–6 || 7–4
|- bgcolor="#ffdddd"
| April 7 || No. 12 LSU || No. 1 || McKethan Stadium || 7–8 || Bonvillain (2–0) || Maddox (2–2) || Goody (4) || 6,108 || 25–7 || 7–5
|- bgcolor="#ddffdd"
| April 10 || at No. 1 Florida StateRivalry || No. 4 || Dick Howser StadiumTallahassee, FL || 6–3 || Harris (1–0) || Bird (0–1) || Maddox (9) || 6,730 || 26–7 || –
|- bgcolor="#ddffdd"
| April 13 || at  || No. 4 || Knoxville, TN || 3–1 || Crawford (4–1) || Godley (4–2) || Maddox (10) || 3,401 || 27–7 || 8–5
|- bgcolor="#ffdddd"
| April 14 || at Tennessee || No. 4 ||  || 4–5 || Saberhagen (4–0) || Magliozzi (4–1) || Blount (9) || 2,838 || 27–8 || 8–6
|- bgcolor="#ddffdd"
| April 15 || at Tennessee || No. 4 ||  || 8–1 || Johnson (5–1) || Williams (2–4) || None || 3,322 || 28–8 || 9–6
|- bgcolor="#ddffdd"
| April 17 ||  || No. 1 || McKethan Stadium || 8–2 || Larson (4–0) || Hart (1–1) || None || 3,002 || 29–8 || –
|- bgcolor="#ddffdd"
| April 20 ||  || No. 1 || McKethan Stadium || 3–216 || Larson (5–0) || Swinford (0–1) || None || 4,840 || 30–8 || 10–6
|- bgcolor="#ffdddd"
| April 21 || Georgia || No. 1 || McKethan Stadium || 3–5 || Palazzone (2–5) || Johnson (5–2) || Dieterich (7) || 4,458 || 30–9 || 10–7
|- bgcolor="#ddffdd"
| April 22 || Georgia || No. 1 || McKethan Stadium || 6–3 || Whitson (2–0) || Benzor (4–2) || Maddox (11) || 4,492 || 31–9 || 11–7
|- bgcolor="#ffdddd"
| April 24 ||  || No. 2 || McKethan Stadium || 3–5 || Barbosa (5–3) || Gibson (1–1) || Leasure (6) || 2,897 || 31–10 || –
|- bgcolor="#ddffdd"
| April 25 || Bethune–Cookman || No. 2 || McKethan Stadium || 10–1 || Whitson (3–0) || Durapau (2–5) || None || 2,563 || 32–10 || –
|- bgcolor="#ddffdd"
| April 27 || No. 17 Arkansas || No. 2 || McKethan Stadium || 3–2 || Randall (4–1) || Stanek (6–3) || Maddox (12) || 3,906 || 33–10 || 12–7
|- bgcolor="#ffdddd"
| April 28 || No. 17 Arkansas || No. 2 || McKethan Stadium || 1–5 || Moore (4–1) || Johnson (5–3) || None || 4,894 || 33–11 || 12–8
|- bgcolor="#ffdddd"
| April 29 || No. 17 Arkansas || No. 2 || McKethan Stadium || 1–310 || Suggs (4–0) || Magliozzi (4–2) || Astin (7) || 3,927 || 33–12 || 12–9
|-

|- bgcolor="#ddffdd"
| May 3 || at No. 6 Kentucky || No. 5 || Cliff Hagan StadiumLexington, KY || 5–3 || Randall (5–1) || Rogers (5–3) || Rodriguez (1) || 2,457 || 34–12 || 13–9
|- bgcolor="#ddffdd"
| May 4 || at No. 6 Kentucky || No. 5 || Cliff Hagan Stadium || 5–1 || Larson (6–0) || Grundy (4–2) || Rodriguez (2) || 2,925 || 35–12 || 14–9
|- bgcolor="#ffdddd"
| May 5 || at No. 6 Kentucky || No. 5 || Cliff Hagan Stadium || 1–2 || Littrell (7–0) || Johnson (5–4) || Gott (9) || 2,607 || 35–13 || 14–10
|- bgcolor="#ddffdd"
| May 8 ||  || No. 5 || McKethan Stadium || 4–311 || Harris (2–0) || Karmeris (0–2) || None || 2,714 || 36–13 || –
|- bgcolor="#ddffdd"
| May 11 || Mississippi State || No. 5 || McKethan Stadium || 4–1 || Randall (6–1) || Stratton (9–1) || Rodriguez (3) || 3,875 || 37–13 || 15–10
|- bgcolor="#ffdddd"
| May 12 || Mississippi State || No. 5 || McKethan Stadium || 0–2 || Graveman (4–3) || Crawford (4–2) || Holder (4) || 4,593 || 37–14 || 15–11
|- bgcolor="#ddffdd"
| May 13 || Mississippi State || No. 5 || McKethan Stadium || 2–1 || Maddox (3–2) || Lindgren (1–2) || None || 3,299 || 38–14 || 16–11
|- bgcolor="#ffdddd"
| May 15 || at  || No. 3 || Birmingham, AL || 7–12 || Irby (4–1) || Magliozzi (4–3) || None || 1,722 || 38–15 || –
|- bgcolor="#ddffdd"
| May 17 || at  || No. 3 || Plainsman ParkAuburn, AL || 6–0 || Randall (7–1) || Jacobs (5–3) || None || 2,652 || 39–15 || 17–11
|- bgcolor="#ddffdd"
| May 18 || at Auburn || No. 3 || Plainsman Park || 10–1 || Johnson (6–4) || Koger (3–5) || None || 3,511  || 40–15 || 18–11
|- bgcolor="#ffdddd"
| May 19 || at Auburn || No. 3 || Plainsman Park || 4–5 || Varnadore (4–7) || Rodriguez (3–2) || Bryant (6) || 2,983 || 40–16 || 18–12
|-

|-
! style="background:#FF4A00;color:white;"| Post-Season
|-

|- bgcolor="#ddffdd"
| May 22 || vs. (10)  ||  || Regions ParkHoover, AL || 6–1 || Crawford (5–2) || Jacobs (5–4) || None || 7,145 || 41–16 || 1–0
|- bgcolor="#ffdddd"
| May 24 || vs. (5)  ||  || Regions Park || 1–2 || Selman (9–3) || Randall (7–2) || Miller (1) || 6,672 || 41–17 || 1–1
|- bgcolor="#ddffdd"
| May 25 ||  ||  || Regions Park || 7–2 || Johnson (7–4) || Holmes (6–1) || None || 9,067 || 42–17 || 2–1
|- bgcolor="#ffdddd"
| May 26 || vs. (5) Vanderbilt ||  || Regions Park || 6–8 || Clinard (7–2) || Maddox (3–3) || VerHagen (2) || 9,243 || 42–18 || 2–2
|-

|- bgcolor="#ddffdd"
| June 1 || Bethune–Cookman || No. 1 || McKethan Stadium || 4–0 || Crawford (6–2) || Gonzalez (9–2) || None || 3,285 || 43–18 || 1–0
|- bgcolor="#ddffdd"
| June 2 || No. 24  || No. 1 || McKethan Stadium || 6–2 || Randall (8–2) || Farmer (8–4) || Rodriguez (4) || 4,584 || 44–18 || 2–0
|- bgcolor="#ddffdd"
| June 3 || No. 24 Georgia Tech || No. 1 || McKethan Stadium || 15–3 || Johnson (8–4) || Davies (1–4) || None || 3,537 || 45–18 || 3–0
|-

|- bgcolor="#ddffdd"
| June 9 || No. 16  || No. 1 || McKethan Stadium || 7–1 || Randall (9–2) || Ogburn (5–4) || None || 5,117 || 46–18 || 1–0
|- bgcolor="#ddffdd"
| June 10 || No. 16 NC State || No. 1 || McKethan Stadium || 9–810 || Whitson (4–0) || Williams (4–4) || Kish (1) || 4,568 || 47–18 || 2–0
|-

|- bgcolor="#ffdddd"
| June 16 || vs. No. 6 South Carolina || No. 1 || TD Ameritrade ParkOmaha, NE || 3–7 || Roth (8–1) || Johnson (8–5) || Price (12) || 25,291 || 47–19 || 0–1
|- bgcolor="#ffdddd"
| June 18 || vs. Kent State || No. 1 || TD Ameritrade Park || 4–5 || Bores (10–3) || Randall (9–3) || Pierce (3) || 15,000 || 47–20 || 0–2
|-

Rankings from USA Today/ESPN Top 25 coaches' baseball poll. All times Eastern. Parenthesis indicate tournament seedings. Retrieved from FloridaGators.com

Rankings

Awards and honors 
Jonathon Crawford
 Pitched a no-hitter on June 2, 2012, against Bethune–Cookman in the opening round of the Gainesville Regional tournament. It was the first Gators solo no-hitter since 1991 and the seventh no-hitter in NCAA Tournament history.

 Nolan Fontana
 Second-team All-SEC
 SEC All-Defensive team

 Taylor Gushue
 SEC Freshman of the Week (2/13/12–2/20/12). On Feb. 17, Gushue homered on the first pitch he saw as a collegian and on Feb. 18 hit a two-run triple in the fourth inning of a series-clinching win over Cal State Fullerton. 
 SEC Freshman of the Week (2/27/12–3/5/12). Gushue hit .400 (4-for-10), with four RBI, three runs and a pair of homers during a three-game sweep at #8 Miami.

 Brian Johnson
 SEC Player of the Week (4/9/12–4/16/12). Johnson batted .471 (8-for-17) with a team-high seven RBI during four games, including a victory at #1 Florida State and a series win at Tennessee. 
 First-team All-SEC
 John Olerud Award – (two-way player)

 Steven Rodriguez 
 First-team All-SEC

 Josh Tobias
 SEC All-Freshman team

 Preston Tucker
 SEC Player of the Week (3/12/12–3/19/12). Tucker batted .400 (6-for-15) in four victories including a three-game-sweep of Vanderbilt. 
 First-team All-SEC

 Casey Turgeon
 SEC Player of the Week (5/1/12–5/8/12). Turgeon batted .400 (4-for-10) and scored a game-winning run during a series win at #6 Kentucky.

 Mike Zunino
 College Baseball 360 Primetime Player Of The Week (2/28/12–3/6/12). Zunino batted .400 (6-for-15) with five runs, four RBI, three doubles and a home-run during a three-game sweep at #8 Miami.
 Louisville Slugger National Player of the Week (3/5/12–3/12/12). Zunino batted .389 (7-for-18) with five runs, 11 RBI, four home-runs and a slugging percentage of 1.111 during five wins.
 First-team All-SEC
 SEC All-Defensive team
 2012 Dick Howser Trophy (College Baseball Player of the Year) recipient.

Gators in the MLB Draft

See also
Florida Gators
List of Florida Gators baseball players

References

External links
 Gator Baseball official website

Florida Gators baseball seasons
Florida Gators baseball team
Florida Gators
College World Series seasons
Florida